Santillana de Campos is a hamlet of Osorno la Mayor located in the province of Palencia, Castile and León, Spain. According to the 2005 census (INE), the village has a population of 114 inhabitants.

Hamlets in the Province of Palencia